Daniel Oster (1938–1999) was a French writer. He wrote more than 20 books in a variety of genres, spanning both fiction and non-fiction. A specialist in French literature of the 19th century, he wrote extensively on Paul Valéry and Stephane Mallarmé. In recognition of his contributions, he received the Chevalier de l’Ordre National du Mérite from the French government.

References

1938 births
1999 deaths
20th-century French non-fiction writers
Knights of the Ordre national du Mérite
20th-century French male writers